Anpyeong station is a station of the Busan Metro Line 4 in , Gijang County, Busan, South Korea.

Station Layout

Gallery

Vicinity
 Exit 2: Anpyeong Station Parking Lot

External links

  Cyber station information from Busan Transportation Corporation

Busan Metro stations
Gijang County
Railway stations opened in 2011